CEBEC is a private Belgian rating label for the quality assurance of electrical appliances. Use of this label indicates that a piece of equipment conforms to European safety standards. The label is issued by SGS-CEBEC, now part of the SGS group. CEBEC has its own electrical testing laboratory located in Brussels. It is an approved laboratory for the purpose of certifications granted by SGS.

The laboratory was set up in 2002. In 2004 it was audited by an international team and at the end of 2004 the SGS CEBEC laboratory was approved as a CBTL (CB Testing Laboratory) under the international IECEE-CB scheme. In 2005, it was approved by EEPCA as a laboratory operating in compliance with the CCA, HAR and ENEC agreements.

Certification 

The following Marks and Certifications can be obtained on the basis of testing performed in the SGS CEBEC laboratory:

 CEBEC
Mark of compliance with Belgian safety standards. It is widely recognized in Europe and worldwide and generally equivalent to the European EN and International IEC Standards

 IECEE/CB
International scheme for mutual acceptance of CB test reports and certification, based on IEC standards

 ENEC
European mark for electrical equipment safety

 ENEC+
European mark for performance of electrical equipment

 CCA
European scheme for mutual acceptance of CCA test reports and certification, based on European standards

 LOVAG
Agreement for electrical low-voltage equipment used in an industrial environment

 HAR
European mark for electrical cables

Services 

Product categories 

Products for which certification services are available include:

 CABL: electrical cable
 CONT: automatic control equipment
 HOUS: electrical household appliances
 INST: installation equipment
 ITAV: information technology Audio Video
 MEAS: measuring equipment
 MED: electro-medical equipment
 OFF: information-processing equipment
 POW: power equipment
 PROT: protection equipment
 SAFE: transformers
 TRON: electronics household equipment

Special Tests

Among others, SGS CEBEC laboratory offers a range of testing services:

 Flammability Testing
Tests performed on insulating or plastic materials intended to measure the vulnerability of the material and its potential ignition source through Glow-Wire, Needle Flame or HB, V2, V1, V0 and 5V test

 IP Testing
Tests that classify and rate the degree of protection that mechanical and electrical enclosures provide against solids and liquids as defined in IEC 60529

 IK Testing
Tests that define the degree of protection provided by enclosures for electrical equipment against external mechanical impacts in accordance with IEC 62262:2002 and IEC 60068-2-75:1997

 Energy Performance Testing
Tests that measure the energy efficiency of consumer electrics such as refrigerators and heaters and compare the Energy Performance ratings

 Performance Testing
Tests that compare the performance of electrical products in accordance with European Regulations

 Surveillance Testing
Tests performed on products which are selected on the market or in the factories

Medical devices 

SGS CEBEC provides professional one-stop testing and certification services for electrical and electronic medical devices including:
 Testing
 Certification
 Regulatory Compliance

With extensive experience in the EE medical devices sector, SGS CEBEC laboratory offers testing against all relevant standards, and certification against:
 IEC 60601-1 - Safety
 IEC 60601-2-XX - Performance
 IEC 60601-1-2 - EMC
 IEC 60601-1-6 & IEC 62366 - Usability
 IEC 62304 - Software
 IEC 62471, 60825-1 - LED & Laser
 ISO 10993 series - Biocompatibility
 RoHS & REACH directives
 Mechanical testing against medical device standards
 Reliability testing

Health software 

Intended for software only products for health use, hosted or running on generic devices without specific sensors, the IEC 82304-1 Health Software Product certification and the SGS HSP mark allows you to generate evidence towards presumption of regulatory conformity, based on risk assessment

HSP Services:
 IEC 82304-1 application training
 Consumer/health device product certification
 Medical device product certification
 Pre-evaluation of product readiness and weaknesses

See also 
Conformance mark
CE Marking
IEC 60601

References

External links 
SGS CEBEC Electrical Product Conformity
SGS CEBEC Services and Certifications brochure
The CEBEC Mark brochure

Certification marks
Electrical safety standards organizations